is a manga by Riyoko Ikeda that is the official sequel to The Rose of Versailles.

It tells the story of Napoleon's empire, including the Thermidorian Reaction, the Italian Campaign, the Egyptian Campaign, the Battle of the Nile, the coup of 18 Brumaire, the French invasion of Russia, and the Battle of Waterloo.

It also includes some characters from the prequel manga, like Alain de Soissons, Bernard Chatelet, and Rosalie Lamorlière.

Characters

Real characters 
 Napoleon Bonaparte: the main protagonist of the series. He briefly appeared before in the prequel manga, but not in the anime.
 Joséphine de Beauharnais: the female protagonist of the series.
 Marie Louise of Austria:
 Charles Maurice de Talleyrand-Périgord:
 Joseph Fouché: he briefly appeared before in episode 34 of the anime The Rose of Versailles, but not in the manga.
 Désirée Clary:
 Eugène de Beauharnais:
 Hortense de Beauharnais:
 Joseph Bonaparte: one of Napoleon's older brothers.
 Pauline Bonaparte:
 Joachim Murat:
 François-Paul Brueys d'Aigalliers:
 Pierre-Charles Villeneuve:
 Alexander I of Russia: the main antagonist in the last part of the series.
 Prince Klemens Wenzel von Metternich:
 William Pitt the Younger:
 Marie Walewska:
 Horatio Nelson, 1st Viscount Nelson:
 Mikhail Illarionovich Kutuzov:
 Carl von Clausewitz:
 Arthur Wellesley, 1st Duke of Wellington:
 Józef Antoni Poniatowski: Riyoko Ikeda wrote his story as Ten no Hate Made in 1990. The later part of the story is written almost same as a part of Eroica, but from aspect of Poniatowski.
 Murad Bey:

Fictional characters 

 Alain de Soissons (1760–1804): a character from the prequel, was the sergeant of the Company B, the troops assigned to Lady Oscar's service in the National Guard. He accepted Oscar at first, and even befriended André and smuggled him in the troops, but after learning the truth about her he violently rejected her leadership. Oscar had to fight him to win he and the group's respect back, since they refused to be ordered around by a noble. After losing to Oscar and begging her to save the life of a companion who was about to be executed, which she did, he forgave Oscar and became fiercely devoted to her, even falling in love with her in the manga; still, he knew he couldn't fight against her feelings for André. Ultimately, he survives the French Revolution and the Terror, leading a quiet life in the country. He also appears in the sequel and is the coprotagonist in the first part of this story.
 Bernard Chatelet (1760–1804): a returning character from the prequel.
 Rosalie Chatelet (née Lamorlière): a returning character from the prequel, was a real person, although her life and marriage were much fictionalized. Since then, she married Bernard Chatelet and had a son, Francois.
 François Chatelet: the only son of Bernard and Rosalie, born in 1789.
 Catherine Renaudin (Madame de Talleyrand): the main antagonist in the first part of the story. Catherine is the new love interest of Alain, but she is deeply royalist.
 Oscar François de Jarjayes (1755–1789): although she had died during the prequel, is often seen only in flashback in the first part of this story.

See also 
 The Rose of Versailles

External links 
  

The Rose of Versailles
1986 manga
Drama anime and manga
Historical anime and manga
Works about Napoleon
Comics based on real people
Shōjo manga
Fictional generals
Fictional emperors and empresses